"From Despair to Where" is a song by Welsh alternative rock band Manic Street Preachers. It was released on 1 June 1993 by record label Columbia as the first single from their second studio album Gold Against the Soul.

Release 

The single reached number 25 in the UK Singles Chart on 12 June 1993. The CD includes the B-sides "Hibernation", "Spectators of Suicide (Heavenly Records version)" and "Starlover (Heavenly Records version)". The 12-inch version does not include "Starlover", and the cassette only features "Hibernation". "From Despair to Where" made an appearance as track number 12 on Forever Delayed (2002), the Manics' greatest hits album.

Track listing 

CD

12-inch

Cassette

Charts

References

Books

External links 

 

Manic Street Preachers songs
1993 singles
British soft rock songs
Columbia Records singles
Songs written by Nicky Wire
Songs written by Richey Edwards
Songs written by Sean Moore (musician)
Songs written by James Dean Bradfield
1993 songs